The bluntnose shiner (Notropis simus) is a species of ray-finned fish in the family Cyprinidae. It was found in Mexico and the United States, but is now only known from the United States.

There are two recognised subspecies:

N. s. simus known from Rio Grande above El Paso, Texas, this subspecies is possibly extinct;
N. s. pecosensis known only in the Pecos River, New Mexico,

References

 

Notropis
Fish described in 1875
Taxonomy articles created by Polbot